Capezio is the trade name of Capezio Ballet Makers Inc., an American manufacturer of dance shoes, apparel and accessories.

History
In 1887, Salvatore Capezio, an Italian cobbler emigrated to the United States, opened a shoe repair shop near the old Metropolitan Opera House in New York City. He began his business by repairing theatrical shoes for the Met, and transitioned from cobbler to shoemaker when he created pair of shoes for Polish tenor Jean de Reszke in an emergency. His shop soon became a meeting place for dancers who would stop by to discuss their needs and purchase his shoes.

Over time, his reputation grew and visiting dancers would often come to his shop to purchase shoes. One of those visitors, Anna Pavlova, purchased Capezio pointe shoes for herself and her entire company during her first tour of the United States in 1910, thereby helping Capezio establish wide public visibility.

From 1940, Ben Sommers was president of the company until his death in 1985. He used his position to promote and support dance and performance art, establishing events such as National Dance Week in 1978 and in 1957, the Capezio Dance Award. Under Sommers's tenure, in 1941, Lord & Taylor, Neiman-Marcus, and other stores began to market and distribute Capezio footwear.

Salvatore Capezio's family eventually joined him in the business, and today the company is operated by third- and fourth-generation family members. The company now employs modern, computerized manufacturing systems, though its Special Make-up Department continues to hand craft special order footwear.

In 2017, Lynn Shanahan became the first non-family CEO of Capezio.

Notable users 
Numerous celebrities endorsed the company's products over the years, such as Fred Astaire, Gene Kelly, Sammy Davis, Jr., Alicia Alonso, Bob Fosse, Gregory Hines, Mick Jagger, Liza Minnelli, Ben Vereen, Madonna, Justin Timberlake, Gwen Stefani, Britney Spears, Katy Perry, Lady Gaga and Maddie Ziegler.

Capezio Dance Award
The company established the "Capezio Dance Award" in 1952 to recognize significant achievements in dance, and in 1953 it created the Capezio Foundation to administer the awards program and operate a grant program for non-profit organizations.

Award recipients

 1952: Zachary Solov
1953: Lincoln Kirstein
 1954: Doris Humphrey
 1955: Louis Horst
1956: Genevieve Oswald
 1957: Ted Shawn
 1958: Alexandra Danilova
 1959: Sol Hurok
 1960: Martha Graham
 1961: Ruth St. Denis
 1962: Barbara Karinska
 1963: Donald McKayle
 1964: José Limón
 1965: Maria Tallchief
 1966: Agnes de Mille
 1967: Paul Taylor (choreographer)
 1968: Lucia Chase
 1969: John Martin (dance critic)
1970: William Kolodney
 1971: Arthur Mitchell
 1972: La Meri, Reginald Laubin, Gladys Laubin
 1973: Isadora Bennett
 1974: Robert Joffrey
 1975: Robert Augustine Irving
 1976: Jerome Robbins
 1977: Merce Cunningham
 1978: Hanya Holm
 1979: Alvin Ailey
1980: Walter Terry (dance critic)
1981: Dorothy Alexander
 1982: Alwin Nikolais
 1983: Harvey Lichtenstein
 1984: Willam Christensen, Lew Christensen, Harold Christiansen
1985: Doris Hering
 1986: Antony Tudor
 1987: Fred Astaire, Bob Fosse, Rudolf Nureyev, Jac Venza
 1988: Charles "Honi" Coles
 1989: Edward Villella
 1990: Jacques d'Amboise
 1991: John Curry, Katherine Dunham, Darci Kistler, Igor Youskevitch
 1992: Frederic Franklin
 1993: Dance/USA
 1994: Urban Bush Women
 1995: Bruce Marks
 1996: Charles L. Reinhart
 1997: Mark Morris
 1998: Jacob's Pillow Foundation trustees
 1999: Bella Lewitsky
 2000: David R. White
2001: Career Transition for Dancers
 2002: Michael M. Kaiser
 2003: Alvin Ailey American Dance Theater
 2004: Savion Glover
 2005: Suzanne Farrell
 2006: Donald Saddler
2007: Carmen de Lavallade
2008: Chuck Davis
2009: Arlene Shuler
2010: Trisha Brown
2011: Desmond Richardson
2012: Tommy Tune
2013: Twyla Tharp
2014: Cynthia Gregory
2015: Juilliard School

References

1970s fashion
1990s fashion
Clothing brands of the United States
Companies based in Passaic County, New Jersey
Clothing companies established in 1887
Dancewear companies
Pointe shoe manufacturers
Shoe companies of the United States
Dance awards
1887 establishments in New York (state)